The 1983 Big League World Series took place from August 13–20 in Fort Lauderdale, Florida, United States. Taipei, Taiwan defeated host Broward County, Florida in the championship game.

Teams

Results

References

Big League World Series
Big League World Series